Rudalt was count of Vannes and was the son of Alan I, King of Brittany, and Oreguen.  Rudalt died in November 912.

References

Year of birth missing
912 deaths
Counts of France